Mostje is a small settlement in the Municipality of Juršinci in northeastern Slovenia. It lies on the left bank of the Pesnica River north of Dornava on the edge of the Slovene Hills. The area is part of the traditional region of Styria. It is now included with the rest of the municipality in the Drava Statistical Region.

A small chapel-shrine in the settlement is dedicated to Saint John of Nepomuk and was built in the late 18th to early 19th century.

References

External links

Mostje on Geopedia

Populated places in the Municipality of Juršinci